The Governor of the South Seas Mandate (officially known as the Director of the South Sea Agency) was an official who administered the South Seas Mandate, a Class C League of Nations mandate in the Pacific Ocean under the administration of the Empire of Japan, as part of the Japanese colonial empire, between 1922 and 1944. The territory consisted of islands awarded to Japan by the League of Nations after World War I, prior to which they had been part of the German colonial empire. During World War II, the United States captured the islands from Japan. After World War II, the United Nations placed the territory under the United States trusteeship as the Trust Territory of the Pacific Islands. The islands are now part of Palau, Northern Mariana Islands, Federated States of Micronesia, and Marshall Islands.

List
The following is a list of the governors the South Seas Mandate, as well as their predecessors during the Japanese occupation of the territory between 1914 and 1922.

(Dates in italics indicate de facto continuation of office)

Notes

See also
 High Commissioner of the Trust Territory of the Pacific Islands

External links
 World Statesmen – Palau

References

 01
South Seas Mandate
G
South Pacific Mandate, Governor
Lists of office-holders